Jan Smeekens (13 July 1920 – 23 June 1980) was a Dutch weightlifter. He competed at the 1948 Summer Olympics and the 1952 Summer Olympics.

References

External links
 

1920 births
1980 deaths
Dutch male weightlifters
Olympic weightlifters of the Netherlands
Weightlifters at the 1948 Summer Olympics
Weightlifters at the 1952 Summer Olympics
Sportspeople from North Brabant
20th-century Dutch people